Cao Yaofeng (born 12 December 1953) is a Chinese business executive who served as deputy general manager of China Petrochemical Corporation from 2005 to 2014. He is an academician of the Chinese Academy of Engineering. He is one of the main pioneers of large-scale safety and environmental protection development of ultra deep and high acid gas reservoirs in China. As of September 2021 he was under investigation by China's top anti-corruption agency.

Biography 
Cao was born in Weinan, Shaanxi, on 12 December 1953. He entered the workforce in December 1969, and joined the Communist Party of China in February 1976. In 1977, he graduated from East China Petroleum Institute (now China University of Petroleum), majoring in mining machine.

Beginning in December 1969, he served in several posts in Shengli Oil Field, including worker, deputy chief engineer (1990–1997), general manager (2001–2002), and chairman (2002–2004). In October 2004, he was appointed general manager assistant of China Petrochemical Corporation, one year later, he rose to become deputy general manager, serving in the post until his retirement in July 2014.

Downfall 
On 1 September 2021, he has been placed under investigation for "serious violations of laws and regulations" by the Central Commission for Discipline Inspection (CCDI), the party's internal disciplinary body, and the National Supervisory Commission, the highest anti-corruption agency of China.

Honours and awards 
 2012 State Science and Technology Progress Award (Special Prize)
 2013 Member of the Chinese Academy of Engineering (CAE)

References 

1953 births
Living people
People from Weinan
Engineers from Shaanxi
China University of Petroleum alumni
21st-century Chinese businesspeople
Businesspeople from Shaanxi
Members of the Chinese Academy of Engineering